G R Vaishnav (born 11 February 1990) is a member of the India men's national volleyball team. He wears the Number 1 or 11 Jersey for the Team. He also plays for Indian overseas bank volleyball team. He hails from Coimbatore presently at Chennai.

He played the 2009 Junior world championship at Pune, India which secured fourth and it is the very first time for India to reach fourth position in U-21 World championship. He played 2014 Asian Cup which got Silver medal 🥈 in Asia for the very first time and got an individual award of Best Blocker. Currently he plays for Ahmedabad Defenders in Pro Volleyball League.

Sports career
Started volleyball in the age of 12 in M Nanjappa chettiar matriculation school, Coimbatore and started professionally from the class of 11th in Ramakrishna Mission Vidyalaya, Coimbatore  , Swami Shivananda Sports School and joined in Sri Krishna Arts and Science College 
(a) Kovai volleyball academy (now called as Sriram Volleyball Academy) trained under Indian volleyball team coach G. E. Sridharan – Arjuna Award and Dronacharya Award and after couples of years of hard work and dedication selected to India men's national volleyball team  Taminadu State Senior Men team from 2008 and received a job from Indian Overseas Bank as Manager.

International

Gold medal in 
Volleyball at the 2016 South Asian Games 

Fifth in Volleyball at the 2014 Asian Games

Silver medal in 2014 Asian Men's Volleyball Cup

2012 Asian Men's Volleyball Cup 

2013 Asian Men's Volleyball Championship 

2011 Asian Men's Volleyball Championship 

FIVB Volleyball Men's U21 World Championship 

2010 Asian Junior Men's Volleyball Championship 

2009 FIVB Volleyball Men's U21 World Championship 

2009 FIVB Volleyball Boys' U19 World Championship 

2008 Asian Youth Boys Volleyball Championship 

ASIAN ZONAL QUALIFICATION FOR WORLD CHAMPIONSHIP ( SRI LANKA –Round 1 ) 2013 WINNERS

CHINA CHALLENGERS TROPHY ( CHINA) 2013 SILVER MEDAL

TEST MATCHES AT 
ITALY 2009
POLAND2009
TUNISIA 2010 & 2011 
INDIA – EGYPT TEST MATCH WINNERS (2008)

Individual awards
BEST BLOCKER in ASIA CUP 2014 KAZAKHSTAN
BEST BLOCKER IN Junior ASIAN CHAMPIONSHIP  2010 Thailand
BEST BLOCKER IN TUNIS,QATAR,DUBAI, MALAYSIA

Tamilnadu

SENIOR NATIONALS 2017-18 Kerala Fourth
SENIOR NATIONALS 2016-17 Chennai Bronze medal
SENIOR NATIONALS 2015-16 Bangalore Bronze medal
FEDERATION CUP 2015 SILVER MEDAL
SENIOR NATIONALS 2014-15 (CHENNAI) SILVER MEDAL
NATIONAL GAMES 2014 ( CALICUT ) - GOLD MEDAL
FEDERATION CUP 2013 ( KERALA ) - WINNERS
SENIOR NATIONALS 2013 ( UTTHARPRADESH) – GOLD MEDAL
SENIOR NATIONALS 2012 ( JAIPUR ) SILVER MEDAL
SENIOR NATIONALS 2011 ( RAIPUR ) FOURTH
SENIOR NATIONALS  2008 ( JAIPUR ) SILVER MEDAL
JUNIOR NATIONAL 2006 GOLD MEDAL

Club
INDIAN OVERSEAS BANK
NATIONAL CLUB CHAMPIONSHIP WINNERS 2015
NATIONAL CLUB CHAMPIONSHIP SILVER MEDAL 2012 & 2013
WINNERS IN STATE CHAMPIONSHIP CONTINUOUSLY FROM 2008 TO 2013, 2016, 2017
Al Rayan
VOLIQ
 Qatar Dubai Malaysia Kuwait

References 

https://www.deccanchronicle.com/131218/sports-other-sports/article/vaishnav-tamil-nadus-go-man

https://www.deccanchronicle.com/140110/sports-other-sports/article/v-victory-and-vaishnav

http://indianexpress.com/article/sports/sport-others/asian-games-2014-india-win-in-mens-volleyball-women-lose/

https://www.deccanchronicle.com/131218/sports-other-sports/article/vaishnav-tamil-nadus-go-man

https://timesofindia.indiatimes.com/city/chennai/Volleyball-In-which-TN-packs-a-power-punch/articleshow/46049454.cms

http://www.thehindu.com/sport/other-sports/jerome-powers-kerala-past-tn/article22870604.ece

http://www.thehindu.com/sport/other-sports/incheon-asian-games-2014-indian-men-finish-fifth-in-asiad-volleyball/article6468876.ece

https://www.sportskeeda.com/volleyball/2nd-national-club-volleyball-championship-ongc-retain-mens-crown-kesb-pocket-womens-title

https://www.news18.com/news/india/lusofonia-games-indian-men-defeat-mozambique-in-volleyball-662949.html

http://www.india.com/asian-games-2014/asian-games-2014-nari-president-raninder-singh-heaps-praise-on-medalists-jitu-rai-shweta-chaudhry-153320/

Living people
People from Coimbatore
Indian men's volleyball players
Volleyball players at the 2014 Asian Games
1990 births
Volleyball players from Tamil Nadu
Asian Games competitors for India